Inverrary Country Club was a 36-hole private golf club located in Lauderhill, Florida, northwest of Fort Lauderdale.  Founded  in 1970, both 18-hole courses were designed by Robert Trent Jones Sr. The course has been shutdown since 2020.

Tour events
Inverrary East Course hosted a late winter PGA Tour event for a decade beginning in 1972. The tour event was hosted by entertainer Jackie Gleason in the 1970s, and is now The Honda Classic.  

The East Course was also the site of the Tournament Players Championship  That TPC event was won by Jack Nicklaus, and Nicklaus also won the next two Gleason events, for wins in three consecutive years at the course.

In the early 1990s on the LPGA Tour, it was the site of The Phar-Mor at Inverrary.

References

External links

Golf clubs and courses in Florida
Golf clubs and courses designed by Robert Trent Jones
Buildings and structures in Broward County, Florida
1970 establishments in Florida
Sports venues completed in 1970